Wolfgang Becker (born 22 June 1954) is a German film director and screenwriter, best known to international audiences for his work Good Bye Lenin! (2003).

Biography
Becker studied Germanistics, History and American Studies at the Free University in Berlin. He followed this with a job at a sound studio in 1980 and then began studies at the German Film and Television Academy (dffb). He started working as a freelance cameraman in 1983 and graduated from the dffb in 1986 with Schmetterlinge (Butterflies), which won the Student Academy Award in 1988, the Golden Leopard at the Locarno International Film Festival, and the Saarland Prime-Minister's Award at the 1988  Saarbrücken.

He directed an episode of the television drama Tatort, titled "Blutwurstwalzer", before making his second feature Kinderspiele (Child's Play, 1992) and the documentary Celibidache (1992).

In 1994, he co-founded the production company "X Filme Creative Pool" with Tom Tykwer, Stefan Arndt, and Dani Levy. From there he worked with Tykwer on the Berlinale competition feature Das Leben ist eine Baustelle (Life is All You Get, 1997).

He was a member of the jury at the Venice Film Festival in 2004.

Filmography
 Schmetterlinge (1988)
 Tatort (TV series) (1 episode, "Blutwurstwalzer") (1991)
 Child's Play (Kinderspiele) (1992) – also writer
 Life Is All You Get (Das Leben ist eine Baustelle) (1997) – also writer and actor
 Good Bye, Lenin! (2003) – co-writer
 Welcome to São Paulo (Bem-Vindo a São Paulo) (2004) (segment)
 Ballero (2005) – also writer
 Germany 09: 13 Short Films About the State of the Nation (2009) (segment "Krankes Haus") – also writer
 Me and Kaminski (2015) – also writer

Awards
 1997 Berlin International Film Festival, Honourable Mention for Das Leben ist eine Baustelle
 1998 Bavarian Film Awards, Best Production  for Das Leben ist eine Baustelle
 2003 Berlin International Film Festival, Blue Angel for Good Bye Lenin!
 2003 European Film Awards, Audience Award for Best Director for Good Bye Lenin!
 2004 Goya Awards, Best European Film for Good Bye Lenin!
 2004 Bavarian Film Awards, Audience Award for Good Bye Lenin!
 2004 César Awards, Best European Union Film for Good Bye Lenin!

References

External links

BBC interview following Good Bye Lenin!
"X Filme Creative Pool", webpage retrieved 10 May 2008.

1954 births
Living people
People from Hemer
European Film Awards winners (people)
Mass media people from North Rhine-Westphalia
Free University of Berlin alumni
Best Director German Film Award winners